Some 20 vessels have been built on the River Tyne and have been named Tyne for it. In addition, some vessels built elsewhere have also been named Tyne.

Tyne (1798 ship)
 was launched in Newcastle-on-Tyne. She sailed between Dublin and the United States and apparently was captured c. 1801.

Tyne Packet (1803 ship)
 was launched in Newcastle-on-Tyne. She spent much of her brief career sailing between London and Dublin. Her crew had to abandon her on 26 September 1811 as she had taken on a lot of water and was in danger of sinking.

Tyne (1807 ship)
 was launched in 1807 in Rotherhithe. She spent the first part of her career as a West Indiaman. However, in 1810–1811 she made a voyage to India for the British East India Company (EIC) as an "extra" ship, i.e., under charter. Then in 1818 she made a voyage to Port Jackson, New South Wales transporting convicts. Thereafter, with a change of owners, she traded with the Far East under a license issued by the EIC. A fire destroyed her in 1828.

Tyne (1841 ship)
 was built in Sunderland. She made three voyages to New Zealand, carrying immigrants on behalf of the New Zealand Company. She was wrecked in July 1845.

See also
, any one of six vessels of the British Royal Navy by that name

Ship names